The Paratharia Ahir are a gotra of the Ahir caste found in the Kutch District of Gujarat state in India.

Origin 
Paratharia Ahir is a branch of Yaduvanshi Ahir.The community is believed to have derived its name from the Parathar region, their original homeland. According to their traditions, they migrated from Mathura along with Krishna to the Parathar region of Saurashtra. The Paratharia then migrated to Kutch about four to five hundred years ago. They are now distributed in eighty four villages in Kutch District, out of which thirty four are in Bhuj taluka, twenty four Anjar talukas and twelve villages in Nakathrana. A few are also found in Saurashtra. The Paratharia Ahir has a distinct Dialect (Language), which is more like Hindi and Gujarati. The language is specific to Parathariya Ahir. Other Ahir like Machhoya,Boricha Ahir, Sorathiya Ahir naghera ahir, etc. in Gujarati Speaks Gujarati.

Present circumstances 
The Paratharia community consist of a number of clans, the main ones being the Dangar, Bala, Batta, Jatiya, Kerasiya, Chad, Chhanga, Gagal, Dheela, Mata and Varchand. Each of the clans are of equal status and intermarry. Like neighboring Hindu communities, the community practice clan exogamy.  The Paratharia are a community of small and medium-sized farmers. Milk selling is an important subsidiary of the community. A small number are now petty businessmen.

References 

 

Ahir
Tribes of Kutch
Social groups of Gujarat